Robert Ingalls may refer to:

 Bob Ingalls (1919–1970), American football player and coach
 Robert Ingersoll Ingalls Sr. (1882–1951), American businessman and philanthropist